Youth Action ( or AM) is a liberal political party in Croatia founded in 2005 in Lovran. The party endorses progressive values and mostly advocates greater youth rights. The party has been active in the area of almost all of Croatia through its branches in almost every bigger city in the country. Youth Action regularly criticizes the HDZ/SDP two-party duopoly.

In 2009, Youth Action merged with the Croatian Youth Party.

At the 2013 local elections, party won 19 seats in the county and city councils in Istria, Primorje-Gorski Kotar and Zadar counties.

Electoral history

Legislative

European Parliament

References

Political parties established in 2005
Liberal parties in Croatia
Centrist parties in Croatia
2005 establishments in Croatia
Organizations based in Rijeka